Siegel+Gale is a global brand strategy, design, and experience firm  founded in 1969 by Alan Siegel and Robert Gale. David B. Srere and Howard Belk act as co-CEOs. Siegel+Gale is a part of the Brand Consulting Group, a division of Omnicom Group (NYSE-OMC). The firm is headquartered in New York City with offices in Los Angeles, San Francisco, London, Dubai, Shanghai, and Tokyo. It serves a wide range of corporate, non-profit, and government clients. Its corporate tagline is “Simple is smart.”  Siegel+Gale is known as "The Simplicity Company." Each year, Siegel+Gale releases a study called "World's Simplest Brands."

Siegel+Gale is known for crafting world-class brands, including CVS Health, NBA, Bristol Myers Squibb, 3M, Nielsen, Wells Fargo, IRS, HPE, SAP, AARP, H&R Block, and The Y.

Founding and ownership
Siegel+Gale was founded in 1969 by Alan Siegel, an advertising, public relations and design-trained executive, and Robert Gale, a designer. Frustrated by the complexity of communications across industries, the founders set out to help organizations create simpler experiences. The company was first operated out of Siegel's apartment in New York City. Gale sold his share of the firm in 1974.  In 1988, the company became a wholly owned subsidiary of Saatchi & Saatchi, the global brand advertising and marketing firm. After 10 years, Siegel+Gale organized an employee buy-back of the firm in association with a venture capital firm and Fleet Bank (now owned by Bank of America, Inc.).  In 2003, the firm was acquired by the large marketing and communications company, Omnicom Group Inc.

Expertise 
Clients partner with Siegel+Gale for such engagements as considering a rebrand; delivering category-defining brand experiences to audiences; undergoing a merger, acquisition, or spinoff; revamping brand strategy or visual identity; defining brand purpose; optimizing product portfolio and go-to-market strategy; seeking insights into what drives customer acquisition and loyalty; renaming a company, product, or service; launching new products or services; or attracting talent and improving employee engagement.

Awards 
Siegel+Gale produces award-winning work. The agency has been recognized by Clio Awards, Hermes Creative Awards, Indigo Design Awards, Transform Awards, Healthcare Advertising Awards, Red Dot Design Awards, and Creativity International Awards, among others.

World's Simplest Brands 
To determine the global state of simplicity, Siegel+Gale fields the World's Simplest Brands study: an annual online survey with more than 15,000 consumers in nine countries to gather perspectives on simplicity and how industries and brands make people's lives simpler or more complex. The study consistently reveals that the world’s simplest brands are ones that put simplicity at the heart of the customer experience. The findings reaffirm that simplicity inspires deeper trust, strengthens loyalty, and increases willingness to spend. People are also more likely to recommend a brand that delivers simple experiences. In the end, simplicity drives financial gain for the brands that embrace it and shapes a better future for everyone. The study has found that, since 2009, a portfolio of the world's simplest brands has beaten the global stock index by 1,600%. Furthermore, when brands don't simplify, they leave $402 billion on the table. World's Simplest Brands has been featured in The New York Times, Forbes, Harvard Business Review, and The Telegraph.

Future of Branding 
The brand-experience agency is known the industry over for the pioneering and award-winning "Future of Branding" roundtable series. Hosted by the Global CMO and Head of Business Development, Margaret Molloy, every one-hour roundtable consists of five CMOs discussing thought-provoking topics ranging in theme from collaborating across the C-suite to building resilience to cultivating creativity. The conversations are reproduced on the "How CMOs Commit" podcast, of which Molloy is the host.

Social Media + Podcasts 
Siegel+Gale has active LinkedIn, Twitter, and Instagram profiles. And on the podcast "Siegel+Gale Says," practitioners from the global Siegel+Gale network explore the issues and trends shaping the branding landscape.

References

External links
Siegel+Gale Website

International management consulting firms
Management consulting firms of the United States
Consulting firms established in 1969
Branding companies of the United States
Companies based in New York City
1988 mergers and acquisitions
1998 mergers and acquisitions
2003 mergers and acquisitions